Del Mar Landing State Marine Reserve (SMR) is a marine protected area that lies onshore, about 2 miles (3 km) south of the town of Gualala and 3.5 miles north of Sea Ranch in Sonoma County on California’s north central coast. Del Mar Landing SMR prohibits the taking of all living marine resources.

History

Del Mar Landing SMR is one of 22 marine protected areas adopted by the California Department of Fish and Game in August 2009, during the second phase of the Marine Life Protection Act Initiative. The MLPAI is a collaborative public process to create a statewide network of protected areas along California’s coastline.

The north central coast’s marine protected areas were designed by local divers, fishermen, conservationists, and scientists who comprised the North Central Coast Regional Stakeholder Group. Their job was to design a network of protected areas that would preserve sensitive sea life and habitats while enhancing recreation, study, and education opportunities.

The north central coast marine protected areas came into effect on May 1, 2010.

Geography and natural features

Del Mar Landing SMR lies onshore, about 2 miles (3 km) south of the town of Gualala and 3.5 miles north of Sea Ranch in Sonoma County on California’s north central coast.

This SMR modifies the pre-existing Del Mar Ecological Reserve, an MPA valued by local communities.

The Del Mar Landing SMR is bounded by the mean high tide line and straight lines connecting the following points in the order listed:

 
 
  and
 .

Habitat and wildlife

Del Mar Landing SMR modifies the pre-existing Del Mar Ecological Reserve, an MPA valued by local communities, to better protect nearshore finfish and abalone and their habitat.

Recreation
Abalone diving, ocean and freshwater fishing, swimming, and kayaking take place in the area. Visitors to the area can camp at Gualala River Redwood Park, Gualala Point Regional Park, and Anchor Bay Campground. Collecting living marine resources is prohibited due to the Marine Life Protection Act. Activities such as kayaking, diving, snorkeling, and swimming are allowed unless otherwise restricted.

Scientific monitoring

As specified by the Marine Life Protection Act, select marine protected areas along California’s central coast are being monitored by scientists to track their effectiveness and learn more about ocean health. Similar studies in marine protected areas located off of the Santa Barbara Channel Islands have already detected gradual improvements in fish size and number.

References

Protected areas of Sonoma County, California
Marine sanctuaries in California
Tourist attractions in Sonoma County, California